Harry Brown was an American Negro league third baseman in the 1910s.

Brown made his Negro leagues debut in 1910 with the St. Paul Colored Gophers. He played with the club again the following season, then played for the Brooklyn Royal Giants and Chicago Giants in 1912.

References

External links
Baseball statistics and player information from Baseball-Reference Black Baseball Stats and Seamheads

Year of birth missing
Year of death missing
Place of birth missing
Place of death missing
Brooklyn Royal Giants players
Chicago Giants players
St. Paul Colored Gophers players
Baseball third basemen